Franklin Mitchell Beamer (born October 18, 1946) is a retired American college football coach, most notably for the Virginia Tech Hokies, and former college football player. He is the father of current South Carolina Gamecocks head coach Shane Beamer.  

Beamer was a cornerback for Virginia Tech from 1966 to 1968. His coaching experience began in 1972, and from 1981 to 1986 Beamer served as the head football coach at Murray State University. He then went on to become the head football coach at Virginia Tech from 1987 until his final game in 2015. He was one of the longest tenured active coaches in NCAA Division I Football Bowl Subdivision and, at the time of his retirement, was the winningest active coach at that level. Upon retiring, Beamer accepted a position as special assistant to the Virginia Tech athletic director, where he focuses on athletic development and advancement. He was inducted into the College Football Hall of Fame in 2018.

Early life and playing career

Beamer was born in Mount Airy, North Carolina, and grew up on a farm in Fancy Gap, Virginia.

Beamer is a direct descendant of the notorious Allen clan of Carroll County, Virginia. In 1912, during a court trial, his great-uncle, Floyd Allen, fired rounds in a spasm of violence. The courtroom shooting left five people dead, including the judge, a prosecutor, and the county sheriff.

In 1953, at the age of seven, Beamer suffered a life altering accident. After using a push broom to keep a pile of burning trash in place, he returned it to its place in the garage, unaware that it was smoldering. A spark ignited a nearby can of gasoline, which exploded in front of him. His 11-year-old brother, Barnett saved him by rolling him around on the ground. He was left with burns on his shoulders, chest, and the right side of his neck. Over the next several years, Beamer underwent dozens of skin graft procedures, leaving him with permanent scarring.

Beamer attended high school in Hillsville, Virginia, and earned 11 varsity letters in three different sports: football, basketball, and baseball. In 1966, he attended Virginia Tech and played football. He was a starting cornerback for 3 years, playing in the 1966 and 1968 Liberty Bowls. He graduated from Virginia Tech in 1969 with Omicron Delta Kappa distinction, and attended Radford University for graduate school, while serving as an assistant football coach at Radford High School.

Coaching career

Early coaching positions
Beamer began as an assistant at Radford High School from 1969 through 1971. His college coaching experience began in 1972, when he became a graduate assistant for the University of Maryland, College Park. After one season, he became an assistant coach at The Citadel under Bobby Ross. He spent seven seasons at The Citadel, the last two as the defensive coordinator.

Murray State
Beamer was hired as the defensive coordinator at Murray State University in 1979 under head coach, Mike Gottfried. In 1981, after two seasons as defensive coordinator, he was promoted to head coach. In his six years as head coach, Beamer compiled a record of 42–23–2 (.642). He hired former Murray State defensive back Bud Foster as a graduate assistant in 1981. Foster later joined Beamer's coaching staff at Virginia Tech in 1987.

Virginia Tech

Early years (1987–1992)

On December 22, 1986, Beamer was hired as the head coach at Virginia Tech, replacing Bill Dooley, the winningest coach in school history to date. However, Dooley had been forced to resign due to numerous NCAA violations. Beamer signed a four-year contract worth $80,000 annually, hired by Virginia Tech's new athletic director, Dale Baughman, also replacing Dooley in that capacity. Beamer took over a Virginia Tech football program that had reached six bowl games to that point (three under Dooley).

As a result of the violations uncovered under Dooley's watch, the Hokies were limited to 85 total scholarships in 1988 and 1989, and 17 initial scholarships in 1989. The sanctions hampered the Hokies, and Beamer went a combined 5–17 in 1987 and 1988. Beamer's record in his first six seasons was 24-40-2, a win percentage of .385. After the team went 2–8–1 in 1992, athletic director Dave Braine believed in Beamer and thought he deserved more time. It proved to be a wise decision; the Hokies would not suffer another losing season under Beamer's watch. At his hall of fame induction, Beamer said he would have been unlikely to survive his early years had he been coaching in the 2010s.

Big East (1993–2003)
In 1993, the Hokies would go 9-3 and won the Independence Bowl; at the time, it was only the fourth time in school history that the Hokies had won as many as nine games in a season. The Hokies would go on to a combined record of 75–21 from 1993 to 2000. This included the Hokies' first major-bowl appearances in school history, after the 1995, 1996 and 1999 seasons. The peak year in this stretch was 1999, when the Hokies went 11–0 in the regular season earning a spot to the 2000 Sugar Bowl to play Florida State for the BCS National Championship. Behind the play of quarterback Michael Vick, Virginia Tech led Florida State 29–28 early in the fourth quarter, but lost 46–29. The Hokies finished third in the AP Poll and second in the Coaches' Poll–the highest final rankings in school history, and the highest for a Division I team from Virginia.

ACC (2004–2015)

Virginia Tech continued its bowl eligibility streak into the new millennium and won the 2004 ACC Championship in its first season in the league. Over the course of the next seven seasons, from 2005 to 2011, Virginia Tech won at least 10 games every season. The Hokies were the only team in the country to do so. Beamer's record from 1993 to 2011 was 185–58 for a winning percentage of .761. This was the 4th highest win percentage in the country over this period. Although Virginia Tech went just 28–23 from 2012 to 2015, the Hokies still finished each season with a winning record and a bowl bid.

On November 1, 2015, Beamer announced his retirement from coaching, effective at the end of the 2015 season. He was carried off the field after beating Virginia in the final regular season game to become bowl eligible.  Beamer's last game was a  55–52 win over Tulsa in the Independence Bowl on December 26. Memphis' Justin Fuente replaced Beamer as the head football coach at Virginia Tech at the end of the 2015 season.

Coaching records and awards 
Beamer amassed an overall record of 238–121–2 (.663) in his 29 years at the school. His teams went to postseason play after every season from 1993 until his retirement in 2015. The Hokies' consecutive bowl appearances streak—the longest in the nation at the time—continued under his successor, Justin Fuente, until the 2020 season. At the time of his retirement, Beamer owned all of the Hokies' 11-win seasons in school history, as well as all of the seasons in which the Hokies won 10 games on the field. Bill Dooley's last team, in 1986, finished with nine wins on the field, but was awarded a tenth win by forfeit.

Beamer's teams won three Big East championships and four ACC titles. Beamer won many awards over his career. He was named the Big East Coach of the Year three times, in 1995, 1996, and 1999. He also was named  the ACC Coach of the Year in 2004 and 2005.

Bowl games
Beamer led the Virginia Tech Hokies to 23 consecutive bowl games beginning in his seventh season in 1993 until he retired in 2015. It was the second-longest active consecutive bowl streak in the country at the time of his retirement.

* Assistant Head Coach, Shane Beamer was the acting Head Coach for the 2014 Military Bowl.

Retirement and post-coaching career
On November 1, 2015, after 29 seasons as head coach of Virginia Tech, Beamer announced his retirement from coaching, effective at the end of the 2015 season. During his tenure, he coached the Hokies to 23 consecutive bowl games, including a national championship appearance, along with seven conference championship titles. At the time of his retirement, he was the winningest active coach in Division I FBS with 280 career victories. and is the sixth winningest coach in history at the Division I FBS level.

Special assistant to the Virginia Tech athletic director
In late 2015, shortly after announcing his retirement at the end of the season,  Beamer signed an eight-year contract with Virginia Tech, serving as a special assistant to Whit Babcock, director of athletics at Virginia Tech, focusing on athletic development and advancement.

College Football Playoff Committee
On January 17, 2017, Beamer was appointed to the College Football Playoff Committee. Beamer joined the 13-member panel, which was formed when the College Football Playoff was implemented in 2013. It is a 3-year appointment and he was the 14th person to be named to the committee. The members meet each of the final six weeks of the regular season to create a weekly poll of the top 25 teams in the country. The panel determines the top four college football teams for the playoff games to decide the national champion.

Legacy

Hall of Fame Inductions

Honors and tributes
"Beamerball"

During Beamer's tenure at Virginia Tech, putting points on the scoreboard has become a full team effort with the offensive, defensive and special teams units. Often when the team scores one or more non-offensive touchdowns, the style of play is described as "Beamerball". Since Beamer's first season in 1987, a player at every position on the defensive unit has scored at least one touchdown, and 35 different players have scored touchdowns on Virginia Tech's special teams.

Beamer Way

On August 6, 2015, Virginia Tech renamed Spring Road to 'Beamer Way' in honor of Beamer. Located on the west side of Lane Stadium, it is the primary access route to the campus sports facilities. The Virginia Tech Athletics Department also changed its mailing address to '25 Beamer Way' to commemorate his jersey number as a player at the school.

#25 Beamer Jersey

Before the beginning of the 2016 football season, new coach Justin Fuente and his staff collaborated on ideas of how to honor Beamer during the season. On August 29, 2016, the team announced that as an homage to Beamer's transcendent contributions and dedication to special teams, one deserving special teams player would be chosen to wear the number 25 jersey for each game of the 2016 season, earning the title "Special Teams Player of the Week". Beamer wore the number 25 when he played at Virginia Tech as a cornerback from 1966 to 1968. The honorary jersey became so popular with the players, fans, and coaches that the team continued the tradition beyond the 2016 season.

Frank Beamer Day

February 4, 2016 was declared "Frank Beamer Day" in the Commonwealth of Virginia by Governor Terry McAuliffe. In a ceremony on the steps of the Virginia State Capitol in front of a crowd of Virginia Tech students, faculty, and alumni— including his wife, Cheryl Beamer, government affairs directors, Paul Rice and Harvey Creasey III, and university president, Timothy Sands— Governor McAuliffe presented Beamer with a framed certificate to honor his achievements as the head coach of the Virginia Tech football program.

Beamer-Lawson Indoor Practice Facility

On October 6, 2018, Virginia Tech renamed its indoor practice facility to the "Beamer-Lawson Indoor Practice Facility". The building, constructed in 2016 was renamed for Beamer and the family of John Lawson, a former rector of the Virginia Tech Board of Visitors and longtime donor

Frank Beamer Statue

On October 6, 2018, a permanent bronze statue, honoring Beamer's legendary coaching career at Virginia Tech, was unveiled on Moody Plaza outside the Southwest entrance to Lane Stadium, on Virginia Tech's Campus.

Other honors

 On July 29, 2016, Beamer was initiated into  Alpha Sigma Phi fraternity at the organization's 54th Grand Chapter in Norfolk, Virginia.
 On February 1, 2017, Beamer accepted an invitation from Virginia Tech Men's Basketball Coach, Buzz Williams to be an honorary assistant basketball coach and travel with the team for a game at the University of Virginia.
On September 3, 2017, Beamer served as an honorary captain for the Virginia Tech football team for the season opener against West Virginia played at FedEx Field in Landover, MD.
 On January 25, 2018, the Virginia House of Delegates issued a joint resolution (2018- No.158) commending Hall of Fame Coach Frank Beamer on his many lifelong accomplishments.
On January 9, 2019, Beamer was awarded the Paul “Bear” Bryant Lifetime Achievement Award at a ceremony in Houston, TX. Beamer became the award's 23rd recipient.
On December 10, 2019, The College Football 150 ranked Beamer #19 on its "Top 25 Coaches in Bowl History" list. Beamer was also listed #45 on the 150 greatest coaches in college football's 150-year history.

Personal life
Beamer married Cheryl (née Oakley) on April 1, 1972. The two met on a blind date, arranged by Cheryl's sister Sheila, while Beamer was a senior at Virginia Tech. They have two children, Shane and Casey, and five grandchildren. His son, Shane played football at Virginia Tech as a long snapper, and was a member of the 1999 team that played for the national championship. After assistant coaching stops at four different universities, Shane was hired by Virginia Tech in 2011 as the running backs coach and associate head coach. Shane left Virginia Tech upon his father's retirement in 2015 and after assistant coaching stops at Georgia and Oklahoma currently serves as the head coach at the University of South Carolina.

In 2006, Beamer and his wife Cheryl published the children's book Yea, It's a Hokie Game Day! under Virginia publisher Mascot Books, Inc.

After the April 16, 2007, Virginia Tech shooting, Beamer was a powerful voice in the Blacksburg community, stating that the most important thing that the Virginia Tech and surrounding community could do was to disallow the act of violence to define the university. Beamer is quoted as saying, "We can't let one person destroy what goes on here every day, the caring, the thoughtfulness. We can't let one person destroy that."

Head coaching record

AP rankings from NCAA Division I-AA Poll

‡ The Big East did not begin full round-robin play until 1993

See also
 List of college football coaches with 200 wins

References

External links

 

1946 births
Living people
American football cornerbacks
College Football Playoff Selection Committee members
The Citadel Bulldogs football coaches
Maryland Terrapins football coaches
Murray State Racers football coaches
Virginia Tech Hokies football coaches
Virginia Tech Hokies football players
High school football coaches in Virginia
Radford University alumni
College Football Hall of Fame inductees
People from Carroll County, Virginia
People from Mount Airy, North Carolina
Coaches of American football from Virginia
Players of American football from Virginia